Sidi Fofana (born 11 January 1992) is a French professional footballer who plays as a center-back for Championnat National 2 club Lusitanos Saint-Maur.

Career statistics

References

1992 births
Living people
Association football defenders
French footballers
Ligue 2 players
Championnat National players
Championnat National 2 players
Championnat National 3 players
US Lusitanos Saint-Maur players
US Créteil-Lusitanos players
Paris 13 Atletico players